Allin Braund (1915–2004) was an artist of exceptional, polymathic talent. He was able to work with equal merit in the mediums of oil, watercolour, lithography, stained glass, relief sculpture & sculpture (including the then cutting-edge use of fibre-glass).

His influence on post 1945 art and architecture in Britain and around the world is profound. Yet, unlike his fellow '54 Venice Biennale collaborators; Lucian Freud, Henry Moore and Francis Bacon his works did not start to fully realise similar, commercial acknowledgement until circa 2000.

Braund was born in Devon and educated at Hornsey College of Art. Like many of his generation, he saw active service in the Second World War. He was one of Churchill's Desert Rats (a precursor of The S.A.S) group of British soldiers who helped defeat the Germans in North Africa during World War II. They were highlighted for a hard-fought, three-month campaign against the more-experienced German Afrika Korps, led Rommel (“The Desert Fox”). Braund participated in operations in North Africa, Crete and the Indian Ocean.

Allin Braund was also an accomplished weightlifter, footballer and Golfer. With a 'scratch' handicap he won the vast majority of the competitions he entered. Had golf been today's highly paid 'pro sport' at that time his professional career may well have taken a very different path.

He taught at Bideford Grammar School before World War II and demob'd to Hornsey College of Art (alumni includes Ray Davies of The Kinks & renowned artist, Allen Jones) to teach design and printmaking until 1976.

Over this period he developed a style of cubist space in his lithographs. they were quick to find critical acclaim. Some of these lithographs were chosen to represent Great Britain at the 1954 Venice Biennale. There he joined his contemporaries; Lucian Freud, Henry Moore, Francis Bacon, Ben Nicholson, Henry Cliffe and Eduardo Paolozzi. He became a major force in British art from the early 1950s and gained a following overseas.

Exhibitions with his contemporaries quickly followed in London galleries, such as the famous Redfern Gallery in Cork Street,  St Georges Gallery, and the Zwemmer Gallery. He also exhibited at the Royal Academy and the Arts Council of  Great Britain.  His works are held in the collections of the British Government, the Victoria and Albert Museum, the Museum of Modern Art in New York, Boston Art Museum, the cumin Museum in Southwark and the British Council. His relief sculptures adorn London's Thames River Police Boatyard in Wapping and Paddigton Police Station (now West End Gate).

He was featured in documentaries including The BBC's 'The Artist at Work' and the press, including The Spectator and The Arts Review; editions 1960 and 1963.
Allen Jones described his teacher’s work as  ‘Braque out of doors'.  Braund himself, defined his point of view as ” dissect and assemble”.

Since 1976 until his death in 2004 Braund retreated back to rural North Devon and the famous, warehouse-like 'Barn'. 'The Barn' was huge and attached to his house, which it dwarfed. This was a big, open (aside from the self-constructed, lean-to dark room) multi-media space again, ahead of its time. It housed all the tools and equipment needed to enable his mind over all mediums, some experimental.

His paint works composed of receding planes parallel to the picture plane in a post-cubist idiom. They encapsulated a less formalised response to the West Country landscape and tended to focus on fixing a moment of the changing sky.  Nature for  Braund does not rest, it swirls and fights, but his later work seemed to return to the more romantic simplicity of his early work. The colour is subdued and the forms, whilst inventive are direct and bold. The work you see today reflects a man’s life’s journey- one of creativity, vitality and a unique talent. the  Victoria and Albert Museum and the Museum of Modern Art in New York.

References

1915 births
2004 deaths
20th-century English painters
English male painters
21st-century English painters
20th-century English male artists
21st-century English male artists